The "sea urchin crab" Echinoecus pentagonus is a species of crab in the family Pilumnidae found from the Red Sea and East Africa to French Polynesia and the Hawaiian Islands. This crab is a parasite that lives in the rectum of a sea urchin. In Hawaii, it chooses only Echinothrix calamaris, leaving few of these urchins unpopulated. Its curved and pointed carapace reaches only  in width.

Taxonomic synonyms of E. pentagonus include:
Echinoecus klunzingeri Miyake, 1939
Echinoecus pentagonus Rathbun, 1894
Echinoecus rathbunae Miyake, 1939
Eumedon convictor Bouvier & Seurat, 1906
Eumedon pentagonus A. Milne-Edwards, 1879
Eumedonus petiti Gravier, 1922
Liomedon pentagonus Klunzinger, 1906

References 

Pilumnoidea
Parasitic crustaceans
Taxa named by Alphonse Milne-Edwards
Crustaceans described in 1879
Crustaceans of the Indian Ocean
Fauna of the Red Sea
Fauna of French Polynesia
Crustaceans of Hawaii
Crustaceans of the Pacific Ocean